Morden is an English surname. Notable people with the surname include:

 Clem Morden, Australian rules footballer
 Daniel Morden, Welsh writer
 Jennifer Morden, Canadian film and television production designer
 Jessica Morden, British politician
 Jim Morden, Australian rules footballer
 John Morden, 1st Baronet, English merchant and philanthropist
 Reid Morden, Canadian public servant
 Robert Morden, British cartographer
 Simon Morden, British author
 Walter Grant Morden, Canadian politician
 Wellington Jeffers Morden, Canadian politician

See also
 Morden (disambiguation)

English-language surnames
English toponymic surnames